Atlantic Coast Conference Player of the Year refers to the most outstanding player for the Atlantic Coast Conference (ACC) in a given sport for a given season.

For lists of individual sport ACC Players of the Year by year:

Atlantic Coast Conference Baseball Player of the Year
Atlantic Coast Conference Baseball Pitcher of the Year
Atlantic Coast Conference Men's Basketball Player of the Year
Atlantic Coast Conference Women's Basketball Player of the Year
Atlantic Coast Conference Men's Soccer Player of the Year

Additionally, ACC players of the year in football can be found at:

Atlantic Coast Conference football individual awards

Atlantic Coast Conference